Karel Johan Schummelketel (24 September 1897 – 8 January 1981) was a Dutch horse rider. He competed in eventing at the 1932 Summer Olympics and won a team silver medal, finishing sixth individually.

Schummelketel graduated from the Cadet School in Alkmaar and from the Koninklijke Militaire Academie (KMA) in his hometown of Breda. Between 1920 and 1928 he served as a cavalry lieutenant and adjutant in the Dutch East Indies, and later became a riding instructor at KMA. He returned to the Dutch East Indies in the late 1930s, and was held there as a prisoner of war during World War II. In 1950 he returned to the Netherlands, and later founded and headed (in 1969–72) the Dutch Equestrian Centre (NHB) in Deurne.

References

1897 births
1981 deaths
Dutch male equestrians
Event riders
Equestrians at the 1932 Summer Olympics
Olympic equestrians of the Netherlands
Olympic silver medalists for the Netherlands
Sportspeople from Breda
Olympic medalists in equestrian
Medalists at the 1932 Summer Olympics